Muhammad Zaki was a Sultan of Kano who reigned from 1582-1618.

Biography in the Kano Chronicle
Below is a biography of Muhammad Muhammad Zaki from Palmer's 1908 English translation of the Kano Chronicle.

References

Monarchs of Kano